A primordial cyst is a developmental odontogenic cyst. It is found in an area where a tooth should have formed but is missing. Primordial cysts most commonly arise in the area of mandibular third molars. Under microscopes, the cyst looks like an odontogenic keratocyst (also called a Keratocyst odontogenic tumor) whereby the lesions displays a parakeratinized epithelium with palisading basal epithelial cells.

The term "Primordial cyst" is considered an outdated term and should be avoided. Most "primordial cysts" are actually Keratocyst odontogenic tumors (KOT's).

References

 Kahn, Michael A. Basic Oral and Maxillofacial Pathology. Volume 1. 2001.

Cysts of the oral and maxillofacial region